Ben Gollings (born 13 May 1980) is an English former rugby union player who currently works as a rugby coach for Fiji sevens team. Gollings is best known for his time with the England national rugby sevens team. He is the career leader in points scored on the World Rugby Sevens Series with 2,652 points.

Youth and early career
Gollings was born in Launceston, Cornwall, England. Gollings was educated at Castle Court School and Canford School. In 1997 he led Canford to success at The National Schools 7's. In 2000, he was selected for England in the Students' Rugby World Cup while at Brunel University.

Rugby sevens career
Gollings continued to remain a regular part of the England Sevens set-up. Gollings was the leading scorer three times on the IRB Sevens Series—343 points in 2005–06, 260 points in 2008–09, and 332 points in 2009–10. His accomplishments include several records in the IRB Sevens World Series. Gollings became the first rugby sevens player to score over 2,000 points in his career during 2009.  Gollings finished his career with 2,652 points.
On 21 June 2011, it was announced that Gollings' contract with the RFU would not be renewed, ending his international sevens career after 70 tournaments.

Rugby fifteens
Gollings played for Bournemouth, Gloucester, Bath Development U19 side, Harlequins, Newcastle Falcons, Worcester, Doncaster Knights and Sunnybank. Whilst at Newcastle he was a replacement as they won the 2004 Anglo-Welsh Cup final. Three years earlier in 2001 he was on the losing side in the same competition when Newcastle beat his old club Harlequins. In 2006, he signed to play in the New Zealand National Provincial Championship for Tasman. From June 2007 Gollings joined Toyota Shokki Rugby.

Gollings joined semi-professional club Rugby Lions as a player and backs coach. Gollings won every game with the Lions in his first season, amassing over 100 points for the club himself. He was quoted in the Rugby Advertiser as saying "It's been a special season and I don't think it has fully sunk in with people how phenomenal it is to win every league game. Most of us won't experience that again." However, due to the financial crisis that hit the club in the summer of 2012, Gollings left the Lions in July.

Coach
In late 2012, Gollings took up a sevens coaching role in Sri Lanka. He then relocated to Seattle in the United States to take up a major role with Serevi Rugby, a rugby training and development programme founded by Fiji player, Waisale Serevi.

References

External links
 Gollings website
 

1980 births
Living people
Alumni of Brunel University London
Cornish rugby union players
Doncaster R.F.C. players
English expatriate sportspeople in the United States
English rugby union players
Gloucester Rugby players
Harlequin F.C. players
Newcastle Falcons players
People educated at Canford School
People from Launceston, Cornwall
Male rugby sevens players
Rugby union wings
Tasman rugby union players
Worcester Warriors players
Toyota Industries Shuttles Aichi players
Expatriate rugby union players in Japan
Expatriate rugby union players in New Zealand
English expatriate sportspeople in Japan
English expatriate sportspeople in New Zealand
English expatriate rugby union players
England international rugby sevens players
Commonwealth Games medallists in rugby sevens
Commonwealth Games silver medallists for England
Commonwealth Games rugby sevens players of England
Rugby sevens players at the 2010 Commonwealth Games
Rugby sevens players at the 2006 Commonwealth Games
English expatriate sportspeople in Australia
Rugby union players from Cornwall
Medallists at the 2006 Commonwealth Games